Ryan Ashley Humphrey (born July 24, 1979) is a former American professional basketball player, at the power forward position. Humphrey is currently an assistant basketball coach at The University of Oklahoma.  Previously he was a coach at Notre Dame.

After a college career at both the University of Oklahoma and the University of Notre Dame, Humphrey was a first-round pick of the Utah Jazz in the 2002 NBA Draft. On draft day, he was traded to the Orlando Magic in exchange for their pick, Curtis Borchardt. After appearing in 1/2 season with Orlando, Humphrey was traded to the Memphis Grizzlies alongside Mike Miller, exchanged for Drew Gooden and Gordan Giriček. He played only 2 games during the 2003–04 season and then played  35 games for Memphis during the 2004–05 season.

Humphrey's final NBA game was on March 16, 2005 in a 88–82 win over the New Orleans Hornets where he recorded 2 points and 1 rebound. Humphrey played a total of 85 career games from 2002–2005 and averaged 2.3 points and 2.2 rebounds.

After a failed return attempt with the Minnesota Timberwolves (2005-06's preseason), Humphrey moved to the Italian league, with Bipop Carire Reggio Emilia. He signed with the Los Angeles Clippers in September 2006 but was waived in late October, also before the league's tip-off. He later signed with APOEL B.C. in Cyprus, with whom he reached the 2007 Cypriot league finals.

In 2009, he arrived in Spain and played with Baloncesto León in the LEB Oro. In 2010, he signed with Cáceres 2016.

On April 4, 2013, he signed with Blancos de Rueda Valladolid.

References

External links
College & NBA stats @ basketballreference.com
NBA.com profile
Basketpedya career data

1979 births
Living people
African-American basketball players
American expatriate basketball people in Argentina
American expatriate basketball people in Cyprus
American expatriate basketball people in the Dominican Republic
American expatriate basketball people in Italy
American expatriate basketball people in Spain
American expatriate basketball people in Uruguay
American expatriate basketball people in Venezuela
American men's basketball players
APOEL B.C. players
Atenas basketball players
Baloncesto León players
Basketball players from Oklahoma
Booker T. Washington High School (Tulsa, Oklahoma) alumni
Bucaneros de La Guaira players
CB Murcia players
CB Valladolid players
Club Biguá de Villa Biarritz basketball players
La Unión basketball players
Liga ACB players
McDonald's High School All-Americans
Memphis Grizzlies players
Notre Dame Fighting Irish men's basketball coaches
Notre Dame Fighting Irish men's basketball players
Obras Sanitarias basketball players
Oklahoma Sooners men's basketball players
Orlando Magic players
Pallacanestro Reggiana players
Parade High School All-Americans (boys' basketball)
Power forwards (basketball)
Sportspeople from Tulsa, Oklahoma
Tulsa 66ers players
Utah Jazz draft picks
21st-century African-American sportspeople
20th-century African-American sportspeople
Criollos de Caguas basketball players